Chaukidanda is an administrative Headquarter of Salpasilichho Rural Municipality in Bhojpur District in the Province No. 1 of eastern Nepal. It is ward no.-3 too on newly formed Salpasilichho Rural Municipality in northern part of District.

It is headquarter of Salpasilichho Rural Municipality.

Many construction projects for municipality are underway. Land revenue office, hospitals, agricultural service centers are going to establish.

Nabil Bank, "A" class bank in the country has its branch here which provides all banking facilities.

Sankhuwa-sabha district lies in north of Chaukidanda. In east Kulung, in south Nepaledanda and Kudak kaule and in the west Khatamma local ward level body lies. Chaukidanda is trekking route to Khumbu area of Solukhumbu district from east Nepal. Gothebazar is main camping tourist place towards Namchebazar. Taal is another beautiful place at Chaukidanda for trekking and view scenes at far. It is fertile place to grow rice and vegetables. Cinnamon, Rudrakshaya production became the important farming in recent days. This place is good in weather and altitude to grow citrus fruits like orange and lemon.
 
It is now " village turning to become a town". Four mini hydro-electricity projects provides electricity in the town and road is recently constructed with vehicle facilities. There is facility of Higher Secondary School,  health post, rice mills, libraries other government offices as well. 3 numbers in 45 Megawatts power projects are proposed at Irkhuwa river which flows from the town. These power projects have already got survey lincences from Electricity Development Board of Nepal Government and now working for project investments as well as survey.

Women Development, a government funded organization is another organization which is actively working in Chaukidanda. It holds many training program. It organizes cultural programs on the occasion of national and local eves too. It is very praised on holding training on making local product and handicrafts. It became a successful institution in Chaukidanda towards women empowerment among others.

There are two social organizations actively working in Chaukidanda. Janata Club, Gopinichaur and Indrawati Youth Club, Tintama are main social organizations which are working for "change for good" in society. These clubs worked not only in social sector but also worked in education, health awareness, sports activities, cultural programs too. People of Chaukidanda love these clubs.

At the time of the 1991 Nepal census it had a population of 2307 persons living in 460 individual households.

References

External links
UN map of the municipalities of Bhojpur District

Populated places in Bhojpur District, Nepal